Barrow Association Football Club is a professional football club based in Barrow-in-Furness, Cumbria, England. The club competes in EFL League Two, the fourth tier of the English football league system. 

Having initially played in the Lancashire Combination, Barrow joined the Football League in 1921. They remained in the bottom level of the competition until 1967, when they achieved promotion to the Third Division by finishing third in the Fourth Division. The club's highest league placing was in 1967–68, when they finished eighth in the Third Division. They declined quickly, however, and at the end of the 1971–72 season Barrow were voted out of the Football League in the re-election process. They then spent 48 seasons in the top two levels of non-league football, with five relegations fromand promotions tothe Alliance Premier League (later the Football Conference and the National League), of which they were a founding member in 1979. Barrow won the FA Trophy (non-league football's most prestigious cup competition) in 1990 and 2010. They returned to the Football League as National League champions in 2020. Barrow's promotion back to the Football League made them the first, and to date only, club to have been promoted back to the Football League having previously lost their league place via the re-election process.

The club colours are blue and white and their nickname is The Bluebirds. The record attendance at Holker Street is 16,874, for a match against Swansea Town in a 1954 FA Cup third round fixture. Since 1909, Barrow have played their home games at Holker Street near the town centre, 0.7 miles from Barrow-in-Furness railway station.

History

Early history
Barrow were founded on 16 July 1901 at the old Drill Hall (later the Palais) in the Strand, and played initially at the Strawberry Ground before moving to Ainslie Street and Little Park in Roose. The club was elected to Division Two of the Lancashire Combination in 1903, and in 1908 it was promoted to the first division. Barrow moved to Holker Street the following year, where they still play. The club remained in the Lancashire Combination until (and after) the First World War, winning the league championship in 1920–21. The victory preceded the formation of the Football League Third Division North in the 1921–22 season, and Barrow became one of the league's founding members.

Football League years
In their early years as a league club, Barrow were notable for their lack of success. Their highest finish before the Second World War was fifth in the 1931–32 season. In the 1933–34 season, Barrow finished eighth. The club remained in the lowest tier of the Football League when football resumed after the war, and were founding members of Football League Division Four in 1958–59. The 1950s saw greater success in FA Cup competition, however; the club's record crowd of 16,874 watched Barrow draw 2–2 with Swansea Town in the 1953–54 FA Cup. A few years later, it was followed by a third-round tie in the 1958–59 competition against Football League champions Wolverhampton Wanderers at Holker Street. The Wolves, captained by Billy Wright, won 4–2.

The late 1960s finally saw Barrow win promotion, after a third-place finish managed by Don McEvoy in the 1966–67 Fourth Division. McEvoy's successor, Colin Appleton, lead Barrow to their highest final league position (eighth place) in the Football League Third Division the following season. The club topped the Third Division league table for one day during the 1968–69 season, the highest position they have ever held. During this period, defender Brian Arrowsmith made the most Football League appearances for Barrow. Barrow remained in the third flight of English football for three seasons, before returning to the basement in 1970. Financial difficulties and poor performances saw Barrow twice up for re-election in 1971 and 1972. On the second occasion, at the end of the 1971–72 season, they were voted out of the Football League and replaced by Hereford United. The initial vote produced saw a tie between Barrow and Hereford for the last place in the league, with each receiving 26 votes. However a second vote saw Hereford win with 29 votes to Barrow's 20. Three factors were highlighted: Barrow's geographic isolation, Hereford United's FA Cup victory against Newcastle United, and the decision of the Barrow board to introduce a speedway track around the Holker Street pitch to offset financial difficulties. Barrow joined the Northern Premier League for the start of the 1972–73 season, and the club spent 51 years in the Football League, 44 playing seasons due to the wartime closedown.

Return to non-league competition

To gain access to the Northern Premier League, the club had to promise to remove the speedway track from Holker Street (although it remained until 1974). Barrow struggled in the league, with limited financial resources. The club were invited to join the new Alliance Premier League in 1979, the first national division in non-league football. Barrow won the Lancashire FA Challenge Trophy in 1981 (their first success as a non-league club since winning the Lancashire Combination in 1921), but were relegated two years later. They won the Northern Premier League title the following season under manager Vic Halom, but were relegated again by 1986. The club hired Ray Wilkie as a manager just before relegation, and Wilkie led Barrow to their most successful period to date in non-league football.

After a number of near-misses, the club was promoted back to the renamed Vauxhall Conference in 1988–89 after their Northern Premier League championship. Driven by Colin Cowperthwaite, holder of club records for appearances and goals, Barrow had two respectable finishes in the conference: 10th in 1989–90 and 14th the following season. In addition to league success, Wilkie had a number of successful cup runs. Barrow reached the 1988 FA Trophy semi-final, losing to Enfield after two replays: the first at Aggborough, Kidderminster and the second at Marston Road, Stafford. The first leg, at Holker Street, attracted 6,002 supporters (a club non-league record). Enfield won the first leg 2–1, and Barrow won the second 1–0. Enfield went on to win the trophy against Telford United in a replay at the Hawthorns in West Bromwich after a goalless draw in the final at Wembley. Barrow reached the first round of the FA Cup the following season, losing 3–1 to Rotherham United.

They won the 1990 FA Trophy, their first major trophy as a non-league club, defeating Leek Town in the final at Wembley. Kenny Gordon, not ordinarily a goal-scorer, scored the first and third goals in his final game for his hometown club before emigrating to Australia. Other notable members of the squad included Kenny Lowe, who was sold to Barnet for £40,000 (a club record at the time) after the final. The following season (benefiting from direct entry to the first round), Barrow made the third round of the FA Cup for the first time as a non-league club before losing 1–0 away to Third Division high-fliers Bolton Wanderers.

Wilkie was forced to step down during the 1991–92 season due to health problems. Barrow were relegated back to the Northern Premier League and Cowperthwaite retired after fifteen seasons with the club, 704 appearances and 282 goals. Wilkie died in December 1992 at age 56, and the road outside the Holker Street ground was later named Wilkie Road in his honour.

1990s turmoil
After Wilkie's departure and Barrow's relegation, the club had three mediocre seasons in the Northern Premier League. In February 1995, Barrow were purchased by boxing promoter and businessman Stephen Vaughan. Vaughan invested in the club, building an all-seater grandstand and signing conference-standard players. The Bluebirds were promoted to the Conference in 1997–98 under manager Owen Brown.

Vaughan (who had connections with Liverpool drug-dealer Curtis Warren) was investigated for money laundering, although no charges were brought. He left the club at the end of 1998, withdrawing the financial support which had kept it afloat. It was learned that the Holker Street ground (Barrow's main asset) had been sold for £410,000 to Northern Improvements, a company in which Vaughan had a financial interest. In January 1999, the club were the subject of a compulsory winding-up order and a liquidator was appointed to run it while efforts were made to establish the ground's legal owner. A members' company was formed to provide financial support for the club, with the long-term intention of taking it over.

Although Barrow avoided relegation in the summer of 1999, they were expelled from the Football Conference for improper administration. With support from the Football Association after a long dispute, the club were admitted to the Northern Premier League for the 1999–2000 season almost a month after the season had begun. Barrow survived in the league under manager Kenny Lowe, despite an almost-entirely-new squad. The team improved over the next few years, remaining in administration. They narrowly missed promotion to the Conference twice, finishing second and third in 2003–04 and 2004–05. The legal disputes over the ownership of Holker Street were resolved in August 2002, and the members' company bought the stadium from the liquidator. In 2003, the Football Association allowed Barrow's "football membership" to be transferred to the new company.

The club defeated local rivals Workington in a two-legged April 2004 final in the UniBond Presidents (League) Cup. The game finished 6–6 on aggregate, with Barrow winning on away goals. After their failure to gain promotion to the Conference in 2004–05, Barrow became founding members of another division: the Conference North, which replaced the Northern Premier League one level below the Conference National.

National League Years
The club had poor form over the following two seasons, narrowly escaping relegation at the end of 2006–07. Manager Lee Turnbull, who succeeded Lowe when Lowe had work commitments, was sacked in 2005 and replaced by Phil Wilson. Defender James Cotterill was jailed for an assault committed on the pitch. In a first round FA Cup game, Cotterill punched Bristol Rovers striker Sean Rigg. The incident was missed by the referee but was caught by the Match of the Day cameras, and Cotterill was the only English player in recent history to be jailed for an offence on the pitch.

After two years as manager, Wilson was dismissed on 12 November 2007. Although the sacking came two days after a good 1–1 draw in the FA Cup first round against AFC Bournemouth, the club's continued poor form was the cause. Barrow's team affairs were shifted to players Paul Jones, David Bayliss and Darren Sheridan. Following a decent run of results, Bayliss and Sheridan were appointed player-managers, and Jones became club captain. Bayliss and Sheridan led Barrow from 20th place in the league in December to fifth, ensuring a place in the playoffs for promotion to the Conference National. They won the semi-final against Telford United 4–0 on aggregate before defeating Stalybridge Celtic in the playoff final at Pirelli Stadium in Burton upon Trent.

Barrow topped the Conference National table during the first few weeks of the following season before the club began to struggle, finding themselves just above the relegation zone by January 2009. They defeated Brentford 2–1 with goals from David Brown and Matt Henney in round two of the FA Cup, their first victory over Football League opposition since their 1972 elimination from the league. Barrow drew an away match against Middlesbrough (a Premier League team) in the third round, losing 2–1. More than 7,000 Barrow fans travelled to Riverside Stadium in Middlesbrough, the highest away attendance in Riverside's 14-year history to date. The cup run earned Barrow about £250,000, allowing investment in playing resources. The club retained their place in the Conference, finishing twentieth.

Following alterations to the squad during the summer, Barrow began its second season in the Conference National in August 2009. The club had a good run after a poor start, losing once in 16 games and reaching the FA Cup third round. They were defeated 3–0 by Premier League side Sunderland at the Stadium of Light on 2 January 2010, watched by 7,500 travelling supporters. On 13 March 2010, a Gregg Blundell goal gave Barrow a 1–0 win at Salisbury City in the first Leg of the FA Trophy semifinal. One week later, a Jason Walker double secured a 2–1 victory in the second Leg to send the Bluebirds to Wembley. After securing their position in the Conference National in the last home match of the season, Barrow won the 2010 FA Trophy Final against Stevenage Borough 2–1 at Wembley Stadium with an extra-time goal by Walker; this made Barrow the only club to win the FA Trophy at the old and new Wembley Stadiums.

The 2010–11 season was less successful, although the club finished in 18th place and remained in the Conference National with a 2–0 victory against Hayes & Yeading on the last day of the season. Barrow failed to retain the FA Trophy, however, losing 2–3 to Conference North side Guiseley. The side was more successful the following season, finishing 13th. Darren Sheridan left the club by mutual consent in February 2012, and Dave Bayliss remained as manager.

The following season, Barrow were relegated from the Conference National after losing 2–1 at Cambridge United on 13 April 2013. Bayliss left the club by mutual consent on 5 November 2013, and Barrow reappointed former caretaker manager Darren Edmondson on 10 December of that year. That season, the club failed to win promotion to the Conference Premier and finished 11th in the Conference North.

On 1 May 2014, it was announced that club members had voted to allow Dallas businessman Paul Casson to complete a takeover. Barrow were 2014–15 Conference North champions, with a 2–3 win away at Lowestoft Town on the final day of the season. Casson aimed for promotion in the club's first season back in the top flight of non-league football. In November 2015, Barrow parted company with manager Darren Edmondson after a poor run left them mid-table and a 1–0 loss to AFC Fylde knocked them out of the FA Cup. The club appointed former Mansfield and Torquay boss Paul Cox manager the following day.

On 20 September 2017, Barrow appointed Micky Moore as first-team manager. Moore was sacked after the club's FA Cup defeat in the fourth qualifying round away at Shaw Lane on 15 October of that year. Former Forest Green Rovers boss Ady Pennock was appointed manager on 27 October, accompanied by assistant manager Jamie Day and player-coach Grant Holt. Barrow narrowly avoided relegation, finishing in 20th place, and Pennock and the club parted company on 18 May 2018.

Former Blackpool and Chesterfield defender Ian Evatt became the club's manager on 15 June. On 24 October 2018, Casson announced that he was stepping down as chairman and selling the club; director Paul Hornby led a management buyout of the club. The 2018–19 season was much more successful under Evatt, finishing in 10th place this time. The following 2019–20 season was even more successful. The Bluebirds were top of the league for the vast majority of the season before the disruption caused by the COVID-19 pandemic. The final league table was decided on a points per game basis, meaning Barrow returned to the EFL as champions for the first time since 1972.

Return to the Football League (2020–)
During pre-season, manager Ian Evatt departed for newly relegated Bolton Wanderers and was replaced by David Dunn. Barrow's first Football League game in 48 years resulted in a 1–1 draw with Stevenage at Holker Street. The Bluebirds finally won at their 9th attempt in the league, with a 4–2 win at Mansfield Town. After 22 matches, the last 9 without a win, and with the team 21st in the table, Dunn was sacked on 13 December 2020. Following Dunn's dismissal, assistant manager Rob Kelly was appointed as caretaker manager. Michael Jolley was named as the new manager on 23 December 2020. However, on 21 February 2021, after 7 games in charge, Barrow parted company with Jolley. Following the departure of Jolley, assistant boss Kelly was once again named as Barrow's caretaker manager, this time until the end of the season. Kelly saw an upturn of form and on 27 April 2021, with two matches remaining, Barrow secured their Football League status for the following season with a 2–0 win at Forest Green Rovers. At the end of the season, Kelly chose not to remain as manager on a permanent basis and left the club. On May 28, 2021, former Forest Green Rovers manager Mark Cooper was appointed as manager. On 24 August 2021, Barrow hosted Premier League side Aston Villa in an EFL Cup second round tie, losing 6–0. In 2021–22, Barrow finished in 22nd place. In May 2022, Pete Wild was appointed as the new manager.

Colours and badge
Barrow's kit for the 2022/23 season is manufactured by Puma with the design boasting a crisp white through the body, incorporating vibrant dual shades of blue across the front to create a stylish Bluebird effect in a nod to the club's nickname. The shirt is paired with blue shorts and white socks which have a blue trim. The 2022/23 away shirt consists of a black body with a Puma seasonal dot graphic to the front, a shell crew neck and Raglan sleeve construction to the back. Both shirts are manufactured with 100% recycled polyester mesh and utilises Puma's  moisture-wicking technology. JF Hornby & Co are the club's front of shirt sponsor once more.

A kit with blue shirts and white shorts was in use by 1912, although Barrow's original colours were black-and-white stripes. From 1939 to 1959, a blue shirt with a white "V" was the design. Barrow's kit has varied from predominantly-blue to predominantly-white, with occasional stripes or hoops. For the 2001–02 season, Barrow played in black-and-white stripes to celebrate the club's centennial. Although Barrow's away colours have varied, the team wore a yellow kit with blue trim for the 2010 FA Trophy final. Barrow's second kit from 2011 to 2013 was sky blue; for the 2013–14 season, however, they opted for a yellow away kit and a blue-and-white-hooped home kit. After a year, the club reverted to a white home kit with blue sleeves for the 2014–15 season. The kits were manufactured by Puma, who had a four-year deal due to expire at the end of the 2015–16 season. The deal was reduced by a year, since the club announced on 30 December 2014 that its kit would be manufactured by PlayerLayer for 2015–16.

The club badge has a bee and arrow (B-arrow) as on the Barrow-in-Furness coat of arms. It features an Astute-class submarine (representing the town's shipbuilding industry), a red rose (symbolising Lancashire), and a football. The badge was created by Thomas Minnican, who at the time worked at Vickers ship yard (Now known as BAE systems) as a painter. He won the Competition to design the badge after it was advertised in the local paper.

Stadium

Holker Street (now known as the SO Legal Stadium) has been Barrow's home ground since 1910. It had previously hosted Hindpool Athletic Football Club, and had been a rubbish dump. The first game at the stadium was a 5–2 win for Barrow against Eccles Borough. The ground was gradually developed, so by the resumption of football after World War Two it had four fully-covered, terraced stands. Its record attendance was in 1954, when 16,784 fans watched an FA Cup third-round tie against Swansea Town. Floodlights were installed in 1963, and the ground hosted speedway meetings during the 1970s which necessitated the demolition of the "Steelworks End" (previously damaged by fire), the re-positioning of the pitch and the removal of the front rows of terracing. After the speedway track was removed, the pitch was moved back to its original orientation and a new leisure centre with squash courts was built.

Under Stephen Vaughan's ownership, an all-seater main stand (named the Brian Arrowsmith Stand in 2017) with a capacity of about 1,000 was built on the Wilkie Road side; the only significant change since then was the removal of an unsafe roof over the Holker Street-end terraces. Described as having "a traditional, old fashioned feel", the ground has three sides of terracing. The Brian Arrowsmith Stand is raised above the centre of the pitch, with flat standing on either side. The Popular Side, opposite the Brian Arrowsmith Stand, consists of an area of covered terracing.
In the summer of 2020, a roof was added to the Holker Street End of the ground after the club had won promotion back to the Football League.

In July 2022, a deal was put in place with SO Legal Ltd to rename the stadium. The stadium name was changed to the SO Legal Stadium in a deal that will initially run until the end of the 2023–24 season.

Players

Current squad

Out on loan

Management
As of 27 July 2022

Managers
. Only League matches are counted.

Honours

League
Football League Fourth Division
Promotion (1): 1966–67

National League:
Champions (1): 2019–20

Conference North
Champions (1): 2014–15
Play-off winners (1): 2007–08

Northern Premier League:
Champions (3): 1983–84, 1988–89, 1997–98
Runners-up (1): 2002–03

Lancashire Combination Division One:
Champions (1): 1920–21
Runners-up (1): 1913–14,

Lancashire Combination Division Two:
Runners-up (2): 1904–05, 1910–11

Cup
FA Trophy:
Winners (2): 1989–90, 2009–10
Lancashire Senior Cup:
Winners (1): 1954–55
Northern Premier League Challenge Cup:
Runners-up (1): 1987–88
Northern Premier League President's Cup:
Winners (2): 2001–02, 2003–04
Peter Swales Shield:
Winners (1): 1984–85
Lancashire Junior Cup
Winners (1): 1980–81

League history

Records
 Record attendance - 16,874 vs Swansea Town, 9 January 1954
 Best League performance – 8th in Division Three 1967–68
 Best FA Cup performance – Third round, 1945–46, 1947–48, 1953–54, 1955–56, 1958–59, 1963–64, 1966–67, 1967–68, 1990–91, 2008–09, 2009–10, 2016–17, 2021–22
 Best League Cup performance – Third round, 1962–63, 1967–68

References

External links

Official website

Barrow A.F.C.
Football clubs in England
Football clubs in Cumbria
1901 establishments in England
Association football clubs established in 1901
Furness
Barrow-in-Furness
Lancashire League (football)
Lancashire Combination
English Football League clubs
Northern Premier League clubs
National League (English football) clubs